Myles Rowe (born June 19, 2000) is an American racing driver. He currently competes in the 2023 USF Pro 2000 Championship driving for Pabst Racing with Force Indy. Rowe most recently competed in the U.S. F2000 National Championship with Pabst Racing as well as with Force Indy.

Career

USF2000 Championship

2021 
After not competing in motorsports for several years, newly formed team Force Indy announced that Rowe and the team would compete in the USF2000 Championship in 2021. Rowe would get his first win at the second race in New Jersey. He would make history by becoming the first African American to win in the series. Rowe would end up finishing 13th by the end of the season.

2022 
After the 2021 season concluded, Force Indy announced that it would move up to the Indy Lights series in 2022. However, this resulted in Rowe being out of a ride for the 2022 season in the USF2000 Championship. Due to a lack of a budget for the full season, Rowe launched a GoFundMe campaign. He received a $200,000 donation which allowed him to sign with Pabst Racing to compete at the opening round in St. Petersburg. After crashing in the first race at St. Petersburg with Thomas Nepveu, Rowe would win the second race and his first with Pabst Racing. With additional sponsorship, he was able to compete at the second round at Barber and would win the first race. Rowe continued into the third round at Indianapolis searching for additional funds with his season likely to be cut short if additional funding could not be found. However, his season was saved due to additional funding from Roger Penske.

Racing record

Career summary 

* Season still in progress.

American open-wheel racing results

USF2000 Championship 
(key) (Races in bold indicate pole position) (Races in italics indicate fastest lap) (Races with * indicate most race laps led)

USF Pro 2000 Championship 
(key) (Races in bold indicate pole position) (Races in italics indicate fastest lap) (Races with * indicate most race laps led)

References 

2000 births
Living people
Racing drivers from Atlanta
Racing drivers from Georgia (U.S. state)
U.S. F2000 National Championship drivers